Javier 'Javi' Hervás Salmoral (born 9 June 1989) is a Spanish professional footballer who plays as a midfielder for Villarrubia.

Club career
Born in Córdoba, Andalusia, Hervás played youth football with local Córdoba CF, making his senior debut with amateurs Montilla CF whilst on loan and also going on to appear for the former's B team. On 4 June 2011, in the very last day of the season, he played his first game as a professional, featuring the full 90 minutes of a 2–1 away loss against Girona FC in the Segunda División.

On 11 January 2012, Hervás signed a five-year contract with Sevilla FC, but was allowed to stay with Córdoba until the end of the campaign. Returned for 2012–13, he first appeared in La Liga on 18 August 2012, coming on as a late substitute for Piotr Trochowski in a 2–1 home win over Getafe CF.

Deemed surplus to requirements by newly appointed manager Unai Emery, Hervás was successively loaned to second-division clubs Hércules CF and CE Sabadell FC, being relegated with the latter. On 7 October 2015, the free agent moved abroad for the first time in his career, joining compatriot Corona at A-League side Brisbane Roar FC.

At the end of the season, after he had made only two starting appearances, the Australians decided not to offer Hervás a new contract. On 6 May 2016 he signed with Bosnian club FK Željezničar Sarajevo, but after only one month he returned to his homeland, agreeing to a two-year deal with CD Mirandés from division two.

In late January 2018, after a brief spell in the Spanish third tier with Mérida AD, Hervás signed with Finnish club FC Honka. In July, he was named in the Veikkausliiga Team of the Month for the previous month, but left at the end of the year.

On 31 January 2022, Hervás joined Villarrubia.

Club statistics

References

External links

1989 births
Living people
Footballers from Córdoba, Spain
Spanish footballers
Association football midfielders
La Liga players
Segunda División players
Segunda División B players
Tercera División players
Córdoba CF B players
Córdoba CF players
Sevilla FC players
Hércules CF players
CE Sabadell FC footballers
CD Mirandés footballers
Mérida AD players
A-League Men players
Brisbane Roar FC players
FK Željezničar Sarajevo players
Veikkausliiga players
FC Honka players
FC Lahti players
Villarrubia CF players
Spanish expatriate footballers
Expatriate soccer players in Australia
Expatriate footballers in Bosnia and Herzegovina
Expatriate footballers in Finland
Spanish expatriate sportspeople in Australia
Spanish expatriate sportspeople in Bosnia and Herzegovina
Spanish expatriate sportspeople in Finland